Hugo López may refer to:

Hugo López-Gatell Ramírez (born 1969), Mexican epidemiologist
Hugo López (athlete) (born 1973), Guatemalan racewalker
Hugo López (basketball) (born 1975), Spanish basketball player and coach
Hugo Lopez (Canadian football) (born 1987), Nicaraguan CFL player
Hugo López (footballer) (born 1988), Spanish footballer